In Greek mythology, Tenes or Tennes (Ancient Greek: Τέννης) was the eponymous hero of the island of Tenedos.

Family 
Tenes was the son either of Apollo or of King Cycnus of Colonae by Proclia, daughter or granddaughter of Laomedon.

Mythology 
Cycnus's second wife Philonome, daughter of Tragasus or Cragasus, falsely accused Tenes of rape, bringing in a flutist named Eumolpus as witness. Cycnus believed the accusations and tried to kill Tenes and his sister Hemithea by placing them both in a chest, which was set into the ocean. However, the chest landed at the island of Leucophrye, which was later renamed Tenedos, and the two survived. The natives of the island pronounced Tenes their king. Cycnus later learned the truth, killed Eumolpus, buried Philonome alive and tried to reconcile with his children, but Tenes rejected his overture: when Cycnus's ship landed at Tenedos, Tenes took an axe and cut the moorings.

Tenes fought with Achilles when Achilles had tried to assault his sister. Though his sister escaped, Tenes died when Achilles plunged a sword into his heart. Even though Thetis had previously warned her son against doing so, for Tenes's death would be avenged by Apollo, Achilles was heedless and sealed his death by Apollo's hands. Shortly after the end of the Trojan War, Agamemnon permitted the Trojan prisoners of war to build a city north of Mycenae. The city was called Tenea after Tenes. A description on the history of Tenea was also given by Pausanias.

Diodorus Siculus relates that the Tenedians founded a sanctuary of Tenes to commemorate his virtues. No flute player was allowed to enter the sacred precinct, and the name of Achilles was not to be uttered in it. Sacrifices were offered to Tenes until recent times.

Greeks used the proverb "Tenedian human" in reference to those with frightening appearance, because when Tenes laid down laws in Tenedos he stipulated that a man with an axe should stand behind the judge and strike the man being convicted after he had spoken in vain.

Notes

References 

 Conon, Fifty Narrations, surviving as one-paragraph summaries in the Bibliotheca (Library) of Photius, Patriarch of Constantinople translated from the Greek by Brady Kiesling. Online version at the Topos Text Project.
 Diodorus Siculus, The Library of History translated by Charles Henry Oldfather. Twelve volumes. Loeb Classical Library. Cambridge, Massachusetts: Harvard University Press; London: William Heinemann, Ltd. 1989. Vol. 3. Books 4.59–8. Online version at Bill Thayer's Web Site
 Diodorus Siculus, Bibliotheca Historica. Vol 1-2. Immanel Bekker. Ludwig Dindorf. Friedrich Vogel. in aedibus B. G. Teubneri. Leipzig. 1888-1890. Greek text available at the Perseus Digital Library.
 Pausanias, Description of Greece with an English Translation by W.H.S. Jones, Litt.D., and H.A. Ormerod, M.A., in 4 Volumes. Cambridge, MA, Harvard University Press; London, William Heinemann Ltd. 1918. . Online version at the Perseus Digital Library
 Pausanias, Graeciae Descriptio. 3 vols. Leipzig, Teubner. 1903.  Greek text available at the Perseus Digital Library.
 Pseudo-Apollodorus, The Library with an English Translation by Sir James George Frazer, F.B.A., F.R.S. in 2 Volumes, Cambridge, MA, Harvard University Press; London, William Heinemann Ltd. 1921. . Online version at the Perseus Digital Library. Greek text available from the same website.
 Stephanus of Byzantium, Stephani Byzantii Ethnicorum quae supersunt, edited by August Meineike (1790-1870), published 1849. A few entries from this important ancient handbook of place names have been translated by Brady Kiesling. Online version at the Topos Text Project.
 Strabo, The Geography of Strabo. Edition by H.L. Jones. Cambridge, Mass.: Harvard University Press; London: William Heinemann, Ltd. 1924. Online version at the Perseus Digital Library.
 Strabo, Geographica edited by A. Meineke. Leipzig: Teubner. 1877. Greek text available at the Perseus Digital Library.
 Suida, Suda Encyclopedia translated by Ross Scaife, David Whitehead, William Hutton, Catharine Roth, Jennifer Benedict, Gregory Hays, Malcolm Heath Sean M. Redmond, Nicholas Fincher, Patrick Rourke, Elizabeth Vandiver, Raphael Finkel, Frederick Williams, Carl Widstrand, Robert Dyer, Joseph L. Rife, Oliver Phillips and many others. Online version at the Topos Text Project.

Tenedos
Tenea
People from Tenedos
Children of Apollo